Catherine Anne Grant Sadleir (born 14 August 1964) is a sports executive and former synchronized swimmer.

Biography 
Sadleir was born in Torphins, Scotland to Australian and Scottish parents. The family emigrated to Canada, then, when she was 16, moved to New Zealand and settled in Lower Hutt.

Sadleir first participated in synchronised swimming when she was living in Canada, aged 8, and represented the country in the sport. She later competed for New Zealand at the 1984 Summer Olympics in Los Angeles with her sister Lynette Sadleir. In the women's solo, Sadleir finished 37th and in the women's duet, Katie and Lynette finished 12th. At the 1986 Commonwealth Games in Edinburgh, Sadleir won the bronze medal in the women's solo.

Sadleir has been involved a range of governance and leadership roles in sport: she was appointed to the New Zealand Swimming Federation board while in her 20s, and also served on the New Zealand Olympic Committee Athletes Commission, was general manager of Sport New Zealand and led the establishment of the New Zealand Academy of Sport. She was the Assistant Chef de Mission for the New Zealand team at the 1994 Commonwealth Games in Victoria. She was the general manager of women's rugby for World Rugby from 2016 to August 2021, when she was appointed Chief Executive Officer of the Commonwealth Games Federation. Sadleir is the first woman to hold the position.

Sadleir completed a master's degree on swimming at Victoria University of Wellington.

Publications

References 

1964 births
Living people
New Zealand synchronised swimmers
Scottish emigrants to New Zealand
Synchronized swimmers at the 1984 Summer Olympics
Olympic synchronised swimmers of New Zealand
Commonwealth Games bronze medallists for New Zealand
Commonwealth Games medallists in synchronised swimming
Synchronised swimmers at the 1986 Commonwealth Games
Canadian people of New Zealand descent
Victoria University of Wellington alumni
Medallists at the 1986 Commonwealth Games